Rolando Gutierrez (born April 29, 1975) is an American musician best known as a keyboardist and music producer with credits from DJ Kane, Jennifer Peña, Chris Pérez Band, Thalía and Verónica Castro just to name a few with two of his productions earning Latin Grammy nominations.

Career

Gutierrez began playing piano at the age of 15 and was no stranger to music as his older brother Robert was part of the powerhouse tejano band Grupo Estrella. By age 18 he was contributing to albums with A.B. Quintanilla III for artists like Selena, Escalofrio, Los Agues, and as part of the group Chikko. Gutierrez continued as a session musician and toured for acts like DJ Kane, La Conquista, Frankie J, Paula DeAnda, Elida Reyna y Avante, Clarissa Serna and joined the power house group Mi Stereo where he continues to tour in the United States, Mexico, South and Central America.

Album credits
 1993 Xplosivo [Ven A Bailar Conmigo]: Keyboards, Vocals
 1995 Chikko [Self Titled]: Arranger, Keyboards, Programming
 1995 Oxygeno [Mas Alla De Todo]: Keyboards
 1996 Selena [No Quiero Saber]: Keyboards, Programming, Sequencing
 1996 Los Agues [Perdoname]: Keyboards
 1996 Escalofrio [Quien Dime Quien]: Arranger, Keyboards, Producer
 1996 Cristian Castro [El Deseo De Oir Tu Voz]: Arranger, Keyboards
 1996 Various Artists [Voces Unidas]: Keyboards
 1996 Thalía [Todo Es Possible] (Single): Keyboards
 1997 Jackie Y Romántico [Siempre Tu Eres]: Keyboards, Arranger, Producer
 1997 Jennifer Y Los Jetz [Self Titled]: Keyboards, Producer
 1997 Various Artists [Tejano Classics "Hacienda"]: Percussion, Arranger, Keyboards, Vocals
 1997 Verónica Castro [Tocada]: Arranger, Keyboards, Programming
 1998 Jennifer Y Los Jetz [Mariposa]: Accordion, Keyboards
 2001 Victoria Y Sus Chikos [Preparate]: Producer, Arranger, Programming
 2001 Alma [Self Titled]: Producer, Keyboards
 2002: Chris Perez Band [Una Noche Mas]: Vocals, Arranger
 2003 Victoria Y Sus Chikos [Cada Dia Que Pasa]: Arranger, Producer, Engineer, Mastering, Mixing
 2003 Michelle [Luz de Mi Vida]: Accordion, Keyboards, Producer, Bajo Sexto
 2003 Happy [LIVE]: Keyboards
 2005 Ricky Naranjo Y Los Gamblers [V]: Percussion
 2005 DJ Kane [Capitulo II-Brinca]: Keyboards, Arranger, Producer
 2008 SouthCoast [The Name Remains the Same]: Producer, Arranger, Engineer, Mixing, Programming, Vocals
 2009 Hilda Lamas [Latina Soul]: Keyboards, Producer, Vocals
 2015 Mannie B [Solo Album]: Keyboards
 2021 Hilda Lamas [Te Voy Amar]: Background Vocals, Songwriter

Live performances
Los Arias (1992)
Xplosivo (1993)
Chikko (1994–1995)
Jennifer Peña Y Los Jetz (1995–1999)
Guyz of Destiny (1999–2000)
La Sombra de Tony Guerrero (1999)
SouthCoast (2000)
Chris Pérez Band (2000–2002)
Ralo's Taxi (2003–2004)
Paula DeAnda (2006, 2007)
Baby Bash (2006)
DJ Kane (2003–2007)
Mannie B (2008)
Frankie J (2008)
The RoRo & SouthCoast Project (2008)
Nemesis (2009)
Elida Reyna (2009)
Big Sexy (2007–present)
La Conquista (2009–present)

References

1975 births
Living people
Musicians from Texas
American musicians of Mexican descent
Hispanic and Latino American musicians 
People from Corpus Christi, Texas
People from Robstown, Texas
21st-century American keyboardists